World Champions Centre, often abbreviated as WCC, is an American artistic gymnastics academy, located in Spring, Texas.  It is home to Olympic Champion Simone Biles and is owned by her family.

History 
After the 2013 World Artistic Gymnastics Championships, Aimee Boorman, the longtime coach of Simone Biles, was looking to leave Bannon's Gymnastix.  As a result, Biles' mother, Nellie, who co-owned a chain of fourteen nursing homes around Texas, suggested that the family build a gym.  World Champions Centre originally opened in March 2014 in a temporary center before moving in September to a warehouse. It now features a 29,000-square-foot gym floor.  The gym opened to the public in May 2016.

Biles International Invitational 
The inaugural Biles Invitational was held in 2018 at World Champions Centre.  Starting in 2020 the event served as a qualifying meet for the Nastia Liukin Cup.

Notable gymnasts and alumni 

Simone Biles:
 2016 Olympic Champion; 5x medalist (4 gold, 1 bronze)
 2020 Olympic medalist (1 silver, 1 bronze)
 2013 World Champion; 4x medalist (2 gold, 1 silver, 1 bronze)
 2014 World Champion; 5x medalist (4 gold, 1 silver)
 2015 World Champion; 5x medalist (4 gold, 1 bronze)
 2018 World Champion; 6x medalist (4 gold, 1 silver, 1 bronze)
 2019 World Champion; 5x medalist (5 gold)
 2016 Pacific Rim Team and All-Around Champion
 7x National Champion
 USA National Team member (2012–16; 2018–21)

Jordan Chiles:
 2020 Olympic team silver medalist
 2022 World Champion (team) and silver medalist (vault, floor exercise)
 2017 World Championships non-traveling alternate
 2018 Pacific Rim Champion; 4x medalist (3 gold, 1 bronze)
 USA National Team member (2013–)
 UCLA gymnastics (2022–25)
 Joined WCC in 2019

Olivia Greaves
 USA National Team member (2018–22)
 2021 World Championships non-traveling alternate
 Auburn Tigers (2023–26)
 Joined WCC in 2020

References 

Companies established in 2014
Gymnastics clubs
Gymnastics clubs in the United States
Gymnastics in Texas